John Shield (10 April 1915 – 24 October 1981) was an English footballer who played as a defender. He played for a number of clubs including Bishop Auckland, Wolverhampton Wanderers, and West Bromwich Albion before he was transferred to Liverpool. He played one game for the club in the 1936–37 season when he deputised for Jimmy McDougall in defence.

References

1915 births
1981 deaths
Association football defenders
Bishop Auckland F.C. players
English Football League players
English footballers
Liverpool F.C. players
West Bromwich Albion F.C. players
Wolverhampton Wanderers F.C. players